Lower Shavertown Bridge is a wooden covered bridge over Trout Creek in the town of Hancock in Delaware County, New York, USA. It was originally erected in the hamlet of Shaverton in 1877 as a crossing of Lower Beech Hill Brook, and moved to its present location at Methol in 1954.  It is 32 feet long and is a wood-plank-framed, gable-roofed, single-span bridge. It is one of 29 covered bridges in New York State. 

It was listed on the National Register of Historic Places in 1999.

See also
List of bridges on the National Register of Historic Places in New York
National Register of Historic Places listings in Delaware County, New York

References

External links
 Lower Shavertown Bridge, at New York State Covered Bridge Society

Bridges completed in 1877
Wooden bridges in New York (state)
Covered bridges on the National Register of Historic Places in New York (state)
National Register of Historic Places in Delaware County, New York
Bridges in Delaware County, New York
Tourist attractions in Delaware County, New York
Relocated buildings and structures in New York (state)
Road bridges on the National Register of Historic Places in New York (state)
1877 establishments in New York (state)